Miata can refer to
 The Mazda MX-5 Miata car 
 Miata, a female first name common among the Gola people

See also 
 Miyata (disambiguation)